was a Japanese photographer.

During World War II he worked as a photojournalist for the Asahi Shimbun newspaper, covering the firebombing of several Japanese cities. Following the nuclear bombing of Hiroshima and Nagasaki, he was sent to photograph the aftermath.

References

Japanese photographers
1915 births
2004 deaths
Laureates of the Imperial Prize